Wierzbiny may refer to the following places:
Wierzbiny, Pomeranian Voivodeship (north Poland)
Wierzbiny, Świętokrzyskie Voivodeship (south-central Poland)
Wierzbiny, Warmian-Masurian Voivodeship (north Poland)